The soler model is a quantum field theory model of Dirac fermions interacting via four fermion interactions in 3 spatial and 1 time dimension.  It was introduced in 1938 by Dmitri Ivanenko

and re-introduced and investigated in 1970 by Mario Soler as a toy model of self-interacting electron.

This model is described by the Lagrangian density

where  is the coupling constant,
 in the Feynman slash notations, .

The corresponding equation can be written as

,

In one dimension,
this model is known as the massive Gross–Neveu model.

Generalizations

A commonly considered generalization is

,

where  is a smooth function.

Features

Internal symmetry

Besides the unitary symmetry U(1),
in dimensions 1, 2, and 3
the equation has SU(1,1) global internal symmetry.

Renormalizability

Solitary wave solutions

The Soler model admits solitary wave solutions
of the form

where  is localized (becomes small when  is large)

Reduction to the massive Thirring model

In spatial dimension 2, the Soler model coincides with the massive Thirring model,
due to the relation
,
with

the relativistic scalar
and

the charge-current density.
The relation follows from the identity
,
for any .

See also 
 Dirac equation
 Gross–Neveu model
 Nonlinear Dirac equation
 Thirring model

References

Quantum field theory